The Light flyweight competition at the 2013 AIBA World Boxing Championships was held from 16–26 October 2013. Boxers were limited to a maximum of 49 kilograms in body mass.

Medalists

Seeds

  Birzhan Zhakypov (champion)
  Patrick Lourenco (quarterfinals)
  Jack Bateson (second round)
  Tosho Kashiwasaki (second round)
  Yosvany Veitía (semifinals)
  Salman Alizade (third round)
  Lü Bin (third round)
  Anthony Chacón (quarterfinals)

Draw

Finals

Top half

Section 1

Section 2

Bottom half

Section 3

Section 4

References
Draw

2013 AIBA World Boxing Championships